Lockton is a small village and civil parish in the Ryedale district of North Yorkshire, England. Nearby villages include Newton-on-Rawcliffe and Levisham. The village is often used as a base by tourists visiting the nearby Dalby Forest.

The village is mentioned in the Domesday Book as Lochetun, which is believed to have derived from the Old English of loca tūn, meaning the enclosure of Loca's people.

According to the 2001 UK census, Lockton parish had a population of 265, increasing to 332 at the 2011 Census. The population tally includes that of nearby Levisham; about 200 people live in Lockton.

The Church of St Giles dates back to the 13th century (nave and chancel) with a 15th-century tower. The structure is now grade II* listed.

In 1961, a Royal Observer Corps watching post with associated bunker was opened up just to the south of the village. It was closed down seven years later in 1968, but the above ground vents and access structures can still be seen.

References

External links

Lockton and Levisham Past and Present

Villages in North Yorkshire
Civil parishes in North Yorkshire